Tara Shine is an Irish environmental scientist, policy advisor and science communicator. Her work considers climate change negotiations and capacity building. She is a former member of the United Nations Framework Convention on Climate Change Group of Experts. In 2020 Shine was announced as one of the speakers for the Royal Institution Christmas Lectures.

Early life and education 
Shine is from the Republic of Ireland. She earned her bachelor's degree in environmental science at Ulster University. She remained there for her graduate studies, joining the Department of Geography. Her doctoral research considered the wetlands of Mauritania.

Career 
Shine took part in Homeward Bound, a global leadership programme for women scientists. She served as an advisor to the Mary Robinson Foundation and on the Board of Trustees of the International Institute for Environment and Development (IIED).  Shine has presented several television shows for the BBC, including Expedition Borneo, Lost crocodiles of the pharaohs and A Wild Irish Year.

She is the founder of the social enterprise Change by Degrees, which looks to teach people how to engage individuals on how to live and work sustainably. The enterprise inspired her first book, How to Save Your Planet One Object At A Time, which looks to advise people in making more sustainable decisions.

In 2020 Shine was elected to the Board of Trustees of IIED and in September 2020 she took over the role as chair. She was selected as one of the Royal Institution Christmas Lectures speakers in 2020, joining Helen Czerski and Christopher Jackson to discuss the impact of human activity on the planet.

Select publications

Books

Journal articles

References 

Living people
Year of birth missing (living people)
Alumni of Ulster University
Irish women environmentalists